Canthocamptidae is a family of copepods. Most of the 700 species are confined to fresh water, although there are also marine species. It contains the following genera:

Afrocamptus Chappuis, 1932
Antarctobiotus Chappuis, 1930
Antrocamptus Chappuis, 1956
Arcticocamptus Chappuis, 1928
Attheyella Brady, 1880
Australocamptus Karanovic, 2004
Boreolimella Huys & Thistle, 1989
Bryocamptus Chappuis, 1928
Canthocamptus Westwood, 1836
Ceuthonectes Chappuis, 1923
Cletocamptus Schmankevitsch 1875
Delachauxiella Brehn & Lunz, 1926
Echinocamptus Chappuis, 1929
Elaphoidella Chappuis, 1928
Elaphoidellopsis Apostolov, 1985
Epactophanoides Borutzky, 1966
Ferroniera Labbe, 1924
Fibulacamptus Hamond, 1988
Glaciella Kikuchi, 1994
Gulcamptus Miura, 1969
Hemimesochra G. O. Sars, 1920
Heteropsyllus T. Scott, 1894
Hypocamptus Chappuis, 1929
Isthmiocaris George & Schminke, 2003
Itunella Brady, 1896
Leimia Willey, 1923
Lessinocamptus Stoch, 1997
Ligulocamptus Guo, 1998
Limocamptus Chappuis, 1928
Loefflerella Rouch, 1962
Maraenobiotus Mrázek, 1893
Mesochra Boeck, 1865
Mesopsyllus Por, 1960
Moraria T. & A. Scott, 1893
Morariopsis Borutzky, 1931
Nannomesochra Gurney, 1932
Neoelaphoidella Apostolov, 1975
Neomrazekiella Ozdikmen & Pesce, 2006
Orthopsyllus Brady & Robertson, 1873
Paramorariopsis Brancelj, 1992
Parepactophanes Kunz, 1935
Pesceus Özdikmen, 2008
Pholetiscus Humes, 1947
Phyllocamptus T. Scott, 1899
Pilocamptus Wells, 2007
Pindamoraria Reid & Rocha, 2003
Pordfus Özdikmen, 2008
Poria Lang, 1965
Portierella Labbe, 1926
Praelaphoidella Apostolov, 1991
Psammocamptus Mielke, 1975
Pseudocamptus Ebert, 1976
Pseudomoraria Brancelj, 1994
Rheocamptus Borutzky, 1964
Spelaeocamptus Chappuis, 1933
Stenocaris G. O. Sars, 1909
Stygepactophanes Moeschler & Rouch, 1984
Thermomesochra Ito & Burton, 1980
Vibriopsyllus Kornev & Chertoprud 2008
Indeterminate fossils likely members of the family are known from the late Carboniferous of Oman, which were found in a clast of bitumen from a diamictite that had likely seeped up through a subglacial lake.

References 

Harpacticoida
Crustacean families